Chai Soua Vang (born September 24, 1968), more commonly known as Chai Vang, is an American of Hmong descent who was convicted of first degree intentional homicide, having pleaded self-defense after allegedly being fired upon. Vang, a six-year veteran of the California National Guard, shot eight people while he unintentionally trespassed upon a hunting group in northern Wisconsin on November 21, 2004; six were killed and two were wounded.

Vang, who lived in Saint Paul, Minnesota at the time of the shootings, is imprisoned at the Anamosa State Penitentiary, as of 2006.

Biography
Born in Laos, Vang and his siblings relocated to the United States in 1980 and settled in California. Vang lived in Sacramento and eventually enlisted in the California National Guard. Sometime , Vang and his family moved to St. Paul, Minnesota. Vang is the father of seven children. He is also a family shaman (txiv neeb) and was a hunting enthusiast.

On Christmas Eve 2001, police responded to a 911 call from Vang's house, according to a Minneapolis Police Department report. The quarrel began when Vang said he wanted to go out and his wife, Xiong, did not want him to leave. Vang's daughter, Kia, recalled running out of her room and seeing her father with a gun. Police arrested Chai Vang, but charges never were filed because, according to the police, Xiong did not cooperate with investigators. A few months later, Xiong moved with the couple's five children to live with her parents in Milwaukee.

Vang's second marriage ended after he allegedly nearly choked his wife to death for gambling away $3,000.

Shootings 
On the weekend of the shootings, Vang went out deer hunting with two friends and their two sons in northwest Wisconsin, a region where deer hunting is particularly popular, east of Birchwood, Wisconsin around the town of Meteor. Meteor extends over a large sparsely populated area. The land in the area is a mix of public and private. It is believed that Vang and his friends began their day on public land, but he later went onto a private 400 acre (1.6 km2) tract of land.

On Sunday, November 21, a hunting party of about 15 people were in a cabin on this private land. Terry Willers, one of the two co-owners of the land, left the cabin and saw Vang sitting in a deer stand. Willers used a handheld radio to ask the people still in the cabin whether or not anyone should be in the stand. Upon receiving a response in the negative, he approached Vang and told him to leave the property and allegedly called Vang racial slurs. Vang then apologized and started moving south towards a trail through a forested area of the property. According to Terry Willers' testimony, "As Bob got back on the radio and asked me where he was at and I said, uh, he's heading south down on the food plot right now. I radioed in to the cabin that I had a tree-rat and I had chased him off." At that point five of the hunters from the cabin who had heard the radio message arrived at the tree stand. Lauren Hesebeck, a surviving victim, stated "Bob had said I'm going to go talk to him to find out who he is, why he's there, and make sure he doesn't, you know, knows that he's on private property and that he's not welcomed there. Denny had said to me this ought to be interesting, let's go and see what's going on. We got in the back of it standing up (ATV), hanging on the rear bar." After following the directions given by Willers, they proceeded to approach Vang further down the trail. Crotteau then suggested making a note of his hunting license number to make a report to the DNR and, according to Hesebeck's testimony, Crotteau "flipped over the hunting tag on Vang's back to get his license number".

The events after the confrontation are disputed. A violent altercation broke out and four of the eight victims were shot in the back, and three of these four were hit by multiple rounds. Vang is believed to have fired about 20 rounds from a Saiga rifle chambered in 7.62×39mm, which was recovered by police. One of the wounded hunters died the next day, bringing the toll to six dead and two wounded. Vang raised his rifle in one smooth, continuous sweeping motion as he circled right, kneeled, and aimed at Willers. Vang later said, “If I don’t shoot him, he would shoot me.”

Vang’s first shot missed Willers as he ran and dove for cover, but Willers landed atop his rifle and couldn’t turn over before Vang’s second shot hit his lower left neck, neutralizing him. Vang instantly turned toward the men on their machines and shot Roidt, the round killed him before he fell, as his ATV, still in gear, idled forward. Vang killed Drew next as the Crotteaus fled in fear, and fired three shots at close range while chasing Hesebeck around the UTV. His third spilled Hesebeck's guts, who fell stunned and still.

Assuming Hesebeck was dead, Vang raced after Bob Crotteau, whose blaze-orange coat made him easy to see. As he fled, Crotteau called the cabin on his walkie-talkie to tell Laski to bring guns. Vang’s first shot missed but the second hit and destroyed him. Willers, meanwhile, had regained feeling in his fingers, and called the cabin for help.

By that time Vang was chasing Joey Crotteau, who fled down a trail. Vang sprinted to cut the corner to the trail to close the gap, and shot him in the lower back at about 65 yards. Vang reloaded, approached closer as Crotteau struggled forward, and shot him again. Vang then closed in and shot him twice more from behind, putting a final shot into his head.

Vang, after reversing his blaze-orange jacket to its camo side, hid near a curve in the trail when he heard the ATV approaching. Thinking Jessica and Laski were likely armed and looking for him, Vang waited until they passed. When he fired, the bullet struck Jessica in the left buttock, and struck Laski, shattering his lower spine and abdomen. Vang ran over, shot Laski through the back, and then stepped behind Jessica, and fired a shot through her neck. Vang returned to retrieve his scope and leave. As he neared the site, he and Hesebeck came face to face. Vang said, “You're not dead yet?” and raised his rifle to shoot. He fired as Hesebeck grabbed Willers’ rifle with his right hand and dove for cover. Shots zipped past over Hesebeck’s head.

Though he could point but not aim the rifle because of his wounded left arm, Hesebeck tried to shoot back. But when he pulled the trigger, the safety was still engaged. He dragged the unfamiliar rifle alongside his body to feel for the safety, and pushed it in. He pointed it again and fired once. He then heard a slight metallic sound from Vang’s rifle, and realized Vang was out of bullets.

Vang fled the scene on foot and discarded his remaining ammunition, later stating that he did not want to shoot anyone else. Vang eventually came across another hunter riding an ATV (who had no affiliation with the victims), and this hunter offered to give him a ride, eventually taking him to Vang's cabin. Vang was arrested when he returned to his cabin five hours after the shooting. An officer waiting for Vang placed him into custody and transported him to the Sawyer County Jail. His bail was set at $2.5 million.

Victims 
The victims were part of a group of about 15 people who made an annual opening-weekend trip to the Crotteau-Willers property. Among those killed were father and son Robert and Joey Crotteau and Willers' daughter Jessica Willers.

Those who were killed:

 Robert Crotteau, 42, hit center-mass.
 Joey Crotteau, 20, four hits center-mass.
 Alan Laski, 43, three hits center-mass.
 Mark Roidt, 28, single headshot.
 Jessica Willers, 27, two hits center-mass.
 Denny Drew, 55, single gutshot.

Those who were wounded:
 Lauren Hesebeck, 48
 Terry Willers, 47

Investigation 
There have been conflicting reports about what may have led to the shootings. According to subsequent oral statements by Vang, one of the local hunters, Terry Willers, took the first shot at him from about 100 feet (30 m) away, and therefore the shootings were in self-defense. No shell casing was ever recovered from Willers' gun even though during the trial Hesebeck admitted to firing a single shot later during the incident when Vang, noticing that Hesebeck was still alive, fired at him again. Hesebeck testified no shot was fired before Vang started shooting. Additional forensic analysis of Willers' gun was not performed by the local law enforcement which caused the court to take a break from trial. The statements of both Vang and Hesebeck state that Vang removed the scope from his rifle before firing his first shot.  Vang stated that race was a factor, alleging that during the verbal dispute, some of the local hunters yelled out racial slurs at him such as "chink" and "gook." On the stand, Hesebeck admitted that Robert Crotteau had called Vang a "Hmong a--hole." Hesebeck also admitted that he told law enforcement that Robert Crotteau had problems with trespassers in the past, specifically citing Hmong hunters, who often travel to Wisconsin from Minnesota to hunt. The term "Mud Duck" is often used in Western Wisconsin to refer to Minnesota residents, similar to "Cheesehead" being used to describe Wisconsin residents. Willers used this term to describe Chai Vang when he radioed back to the cabin. Though the term does not necessarily have a racial connotation, the defense argued that it did, due to the fact that Willers and the others did not know at the time that Vang was from Minnesota.
 	
The criminal complaint states that Vang shot four of his attackers in the back, and Vang himself admits he shot one attacker in the back. He also shot many of them multiple times. The prosecution made use of these facts in arguing against the claim of self-defense.

Trial 
The trial of Chai Soua Vang began Saturday, September 10, 2005 at the Sawyer County Courthouse in Hayward.

Vang told the jury he feared for his life and began firing only after another hunter's shot nearly hit him. He detailed for the jurors how the other hunters approached him, and how he responded by shooting at each one.  He says he shot two of the victims in the back because they were "disrespectful." He recounted with clarity how he killed each victim. While saying on the stand, "(he wished) it wasn't happening," Vang contended that three of the hunters deserved to die:

"Did Mr. Crotteau deserve to die?" Wisconsin Attorney General Peg Lautenschlager asked.

"Yes," Chai Soua Vang replied.

Vang further testified that Joseph Crotteau deserved to die "because he accused me of giving him the finger and tried to cut in front of me to stop me from leaving." And Laski deserved to die because he had a gun & was using it to threaten a life, he said. Vang re-enacted his deeds while on the stand, using his hands and arms to imitate the motions of firing a rifle. Vang's lawyers commented that some of his abnormal remarks were due to the language barrier. Therefore, when Vang responded affirmatively to the question that Mr. Crotteau and Mr. Laski "deserved to die," his meaning implied that the men contributed to the circumstances that led to their deaths.

Conviction 
On September 16, 2005, Chai Soua Vang was found guilty of all six charges of first degree intentional homicide and three charges of attempted homicide. On November 8, 2005, he was sentenced to six consecutive life terms plus seventy years (forty for two counts of attempted homicide plus five additional years for each count of homicide in the first degree); a sentence of life without parole. At the time, Wisconsin was one of 12 states in the United States that did not have the death penalty.

Military experience 
 Six years in the California National Guard, 1989–1995
 Sharpshooter qualification badge (mid-level, above "Marksman")
 Good Conduct medal

See also

 List of homicides in Wisconsin
 List of rampage killers in the United States
 List of Hmong Americans

Sources
 Ashley H. Grant (November 24, 2004). "Shooting suspect had Army sharpshooting badge,"  Duluth News Tribune/Associated Press.  Accessed November 27, 2004.
 "Victims in the Shootings That Killed Six Deer Hunters," Duluth News Tribune/Associated Press.  Posted on Sep. 04,2005.
 Kevin Harter "Vang Tells His Story," Pioneer Press, (September 16, 2005).
 "Hmong Hunters Are Up For a New Season," Asian Week, (November 11, 2005).

References

External links
Wisconsin Court Record
Court TV's complete coverage of the Chai Vang trial

1968 births
2004 mass shootings in the United States
2004 murders in the United States
American people of Hmong descent
American mass murderers
American prisoners sentenced to life imprisonment
Attacks in the United States in 2004
Laotian emigrants to the United States
Living people
Mass murder in 2004
Mass murder in Wisconsin
Mass shootings in the United States
Mass shootings in Wisconsin
Prisoners sentenced to life imprisonment by Wisconsin
People convicted of murder by Wisconsin